John Reynolds of Dane Court, Adisham, Kent (1703–1779) was an early agricultural pioneer.

These methods included the use of kohlrabi (then known as turnip-rooted cabbage) as a winter feed-stuff for livestock, which he introduced from the Netherlands in 1767, a method of growing melons using manure hot-beds and various other innovations mentioned in Dossie's Memoires of Agriculture and Arthur Young's Agricultural Calendar. He also introduced the Swedish turnip, or swede, (Rutabaga) into England.

A tribute to Reynolds in Adisham's parish church was erected after his death. Historian Maurice Crane, who lived in his house two centuries after Reynolds, drew modern attention to his improvement efforts.

References

1703 births
1779 deaths
English agriculturalists
18th-century English farmers
People from Adisham